The Mitchell Caverns, within the Mitchell Caverns Natural Preserve, are three solution limestone caves, only two of which are open to the public, located on the east side of the Providence Mountains at an elevation of , within the Providence Mountains State Recreation Area. The caverns are located in the Mojave Desert, in San Bernardino County, California.

Geology
The caves lie within a thick sequence of marine Permian limestone. They were formed before the Pleistocene epoch, when ground water with a high carbonic acid content ate into the surrounding sedimentary limestone. Stalactites, stalagmites, and other cave formations were formed from calcium carbonate left by dripping mineral water.

History
Numerous paleontological and archaeological finds have been made in and around the caverns. Scientists have found the remains of several prehistoric animals, including a Shasta ground sloth. The caverns were a special place for the Chemehuevi Indians, and a number of tools and material culture have been found. The Chemehuevi knew the caves as "the eyes of the mountain" due to their easily spotted dual entrances located on the side of the mountain.

The caverns are named after Jack and Ida Mitchell, who owned and operated the caves from 1934 to 1954 as a tourist attraction and rest stop for travelers on nearby U.S. Route 66. The Mitchells also held mining rights to the area and dug several prospect holes and tunnels, some of which are still visible.

The area became a state park in 1956. The surrounding lands became a part of the National Park Service Mojave National Preserve in 1994, but the caves are still owned and operated by the state of California.

Cavern tours
The "Tecopa" and "El Pakiva" caves are connected by a man-made tunnel and are open to guided tours led by California State Park rangers. These caves are the only limestone caves in the California State Park system.

The higher view of the desert from the Visitor Center is magnificent…Not too spacious, these chambers contain strangely beautiful cave coral, stalactites, and stalagmites.” 

2011-2017 closure
In January 2011, due to California's budget crisis, all tours were suspended and the Providence Mountains State Recreation Area closed. Vandalism plagued the caverns' visitor center and installations after their closure.

Over a long period, major infrastructure upgrades took place. Mitchell Caverns and Providence Mountains SRA reopened, and the caverns resumed tours, on November 3, 2017, after being closed for nearly seven years.

See also
Providence Mountains State Recreation Area
Mojave National Preserve

References

 http://Desertusa.com - Mitchell Caverns article.
 Robert P. Sharp and Allen F. Glazner, Geology Underfoot in Southern California, Missoula Mont: Mountain Press, 1993.

External links
Official Providence Mountains State Recreation Area website
Committee to Reopen Mitchell Caverns non-profit website
Virtual 3-D Tour of Mitchell Caverns

Caves of California
Limestone caves
Mojave Desert
Mojave National Preserve
Protected areas of the Mojave Desert
Protected areas of San Bernardino County, California
Archaeological sites in California
National Natural Landmarks in California
Landforms of San Bernardino County, California
Landmarks in California
Chemehuevi